Rangpur, Citrus × limonia or Citrus reticulata × medica, sometimes called the rangpur lime, mandarin lime or lemandarin, is a hybrid between the mandarin orange and the citron. It is a citrus fruit with a very acidic taste and an orange peel and flesh.

Common names
Common names for this fruit include rangpur, the name of a city now in Bangladesh. Rangpur is also known in the Indian subcontinent as Sylhet lime (after another region also now in Bangladesh), surkh nimboo, and sharbati. It is known as a canton-lemon in South China, a hime-lemon in Japan, as limão-capeta, limão-cravo, limão-rosa  or limão-galego in Brazil and Portugal (namely in the Azores), and mandarin-lime in the United States, and similarly limón-mandarina (lemon tangerine) in Costa Rica because of its shape and the way its skin is peeled.

History
Citrus × limonia was introduced into Florida in the late nineteenth century by Reasoner Brothers of Oneco, who obtained their seeds from northwestern India. Though often described as a lemon hybrid, genomic analysis has shown it to be an F1 hybrid of a female citron (Citrus medica) and a male mandarin orange (Citrus reticulata).

Use
Rangpurs are highly acidic and can be used as a substitute for limes. However the name lime in connection with this fruit is misleading, because there are very few similarities between the rangpur and other fruits called limes.

In 2006, Diageo introduced a rangpur-flavored version of Tanqueray gin, known simply as Tanqueray Rangpur.

Cultivation
Citrus × limonia is cultivated as an ornamental tree for planting in gardens and a container plant on patios and terraces in the United States. Outside the U.S. it is used principally as a citrus rootstock, except Costa Rica and Panama where it is also grown commercially and is preferred over lime and lemon, used in any preparation that requires a lemon, and grows wild on cow pastures and near human settlements.

References

External links

Citrus hybrids
Flora of India (region)
Garden plants of Asia
Ornamental trees
Lemons